The Fiat R.2 was a reconnaissance aircraft produced in Italy shortly after World War I, and the first aircraft to be marketed under the Fiat brand, (previous Fiat aircraft had been marketed as by SIA). It was a conventional two-bay biplane with equal-span, unstaggered wings and fixed tailskid undercarriage. The pilot and observer sat in tandem open cockpits. The design was a derivative of the SIA 7 and SIA 9 flown during the war, but was considerably revised by Rosatelli to correct ongoing problems with those types. A total of 129 were produced for the Air Corps of the Regio Esercito.

Operators

 Corpo Aeronautico Militare

Turkish Air Force

Specifications (Fiat-S.I.A R.2)

See also

References

Further reading

 
 

R.2
1910s Italian military reconnaissance aircraft
Single-engined tractor aircraft
Biplanes
Military aircraft of World War I
Aircraft first flown in 1919